Joan Apsley (1578 – 14 December 1599), the maiden name of Joan Boyle, was the first wife of Richard Boyle, 1st Earl of Cork.

She was one of two daughters and co-heirs of William Apsley, of Limerick, one of the council to the first President of the province of Munster. Joan was the heiress of lands in Galbally, with a fortune greater than that of Richard Boyle. Joan was said to have been "charmed by Mr. Boyle's conversation," and her father allowed them to marry. She married Boyle at Limerick on 6 November 1595, she being 17 and he 28. This marriage brought her husband an estate worth £500 a year, "the beginning and foundation of my fortune", which he continued to receive until at least 1632.

She died during childbirth aged 21 in Mallow, Ireland and was buried with her still-born son in Buttevant church, County Cork, Ireland. Boyle's detractors maintained that unlike many of his other close relatives whom he took great care to commemorate, Richard took no trouble to have Joan, his first wife commemorated after her death. Boyle commemorated Joan in the south chapel, known as the Chantry of our Blessed Saviour, of St. Mary's Collegiate Church in Youghal, which he purchased in 1606 to make it into a mortuary chapel for his family. This tomb, completed in 1619, depicts Joan kneeling at her husband's feet dressed in "a richly brocaded purple gown." This led to the conviction among some that his monumental commemorative endeavours were motivated by how they could help achieve his personal objectives, rather than sentimental, as Joan's connections were of no direct use to him after her death.

His strongest commemoration of Joan might be in the name he gave his fourth daughter but this may of course have been given in memory of his mother.

References

1578 births
1599 deaths
People from Canterbury
16th-century Anglo-Irish people
16th-century English women
English people of Irish descent